Glipidiomorpha obsoleta is a species of beetle in the genus Glipidiomorpha of the family Mordellidae. It was described in 1955 by Franciscolo.

References

Beetles described in 1955
Mordellidae